Julia Margaret Flesher Koch (born April 12, 1962) is an American socialite and philanthropist who is one of the richest women in the world. She inherited her fortune from her husband, David Koch, who died in 2019. As of August 2022, Forbes estimated her and her family's net worth at $57.9 billion.

Life

Julia Margaret Flesher was born on April 12, 1962. Her family came from a farming background, but when she was born, her parents, Margaret and Frederic Flesher, owned a furniture store called Flesher's. She spent her early childhood in Indianola, Iowa, then when she was eight years old her family moved to Arkansas, where her parents started a clothing store called Peggy Frederic's, which she considered "a beautiful, beautiful shop". By 1998, her mother still lived in Conway but her father had moved back to Indianola.

After graduating from the University of Central Arkansas and working as a model, in 1984 Flesher moved to New York City, where she worked as fashion designer Adolfo's assistant and did fittings for Nancy Reagan.

She met David Koch on a blind date in January 1991, but the date did not leave her with a good impression. She later described her reaction: "I'm glad I met that man because now I know I never want to go out with him". However, the two met again at a party later that year and started dating. She stopped working in 1993, and they got married in May 1996 at David Koch's house on Meadow Lane in Southampton.

In December 1997, she made what the New York Times called her "New York society debut" at the Met Gala. She was co-chairwoman of the gala that year, along with Anna Wintour and Patrick McCarthy. McCarthy said she was "one of those people who occur in New York every few years...she's beautiful, she loves fashion, she knows how to entertain, she's married to an extraordinarily rich man."

Julia and David Koch spent years living in an apartment at 1040 Fifth Avenue, but in 2004 they moved to an 18-room duplex at 740 Park Avenue. According to 740 Park: The Story of the World's Richest Apartment Building, David Koch bought the apartment for about $17 million from the Japanese government, which previously used it to house their permanent representative to the United Nations. In 2018, the couple also bought an eight-bedroom townhouse in Manhattan from investor Joseph Chetrit for $40.25 million.

David Koch died in August 2019, and Julia Koch and their three children (David Jr., Mary Julia, and John Mark) inherited 42% of Koch Industries. As a result, she was listed by Bloomberg as the richest woman in the world and was included on Forbes' list of the 10 richest women in the world in 2020.

In 2022, Koch put the apartment at 740 Park Avenue on the market; a spokesperson said that she wanted to sell it because she was spending more time at houses in Southampton and Palm Beach.

Koch is on the board of directors of Koch Industries. She tends not to seek public attention.

Philanthropy

Koch serves as the president of the David H. Koch Foundation. She was formerly on the board of directors of the School of American Ballet.

During her husband's lifetime, they made donations to institutions such as the Lincoln Center, the Metropolitan Museum of Art, and the Smithsonian Museum of Natural History.

References

External links
 
 Julia Koch – David H. Koch Foundation

Living people
American billionaires
Female billionaires
Koch family
People from Indianola, Iowa
People from Conway, Arkansas
1962 births
University of Central Arkansas alumni